Alexander Wernsdorfer (born 12 February 1951) is a German bobsledder. He competed in the two man event at the 1980 Winter Olympics.

References

1951 births
Living people
German male bobsledders
German decathletes
Olympic bobsledders of West Germany
Bobsledders at the 1980 Winter Olympics
Sportspeople from Mainz